Sasura Hussein Tarry is a Kenyan politician. He belongs to the Orange Democratic Movement-Kenya, and was elected in 2007 to represent the Saku Constituency in the National Assembly of Kenya.

References

Living people
Year of birth missing (living people)
Wiper Democratic Movement – Kenya politicians
Members of the National Assembly (Kenya)